Umm al Kilab is a settlement in Qatar, located in the municipality of Ash Shamal. Owing to its propensity for vegetation, various farms are based in the area.

In the past, its inhabitants excavated sections of its depressed terrain to create small reservoirs that would fill during rainy season.

Etymology
As a rawda where rainwater collects, the area is relatively rich in vegetation. In Arabic, "umm" translates to mother and is used at the beginning of place names to describe an area with a particular quality. The "kilab" portion of its name is the plural form of "kalb", the Arabic word for dog. It was named in memory of a number of dogs that died in the area.

Archaeology
The University of Copenhagen has worked with the Qatar Museums Authority to report on the Islamic Archaeology and heritage of Qatar.

An archaeological site dating back to the Abbasid period with a length of 410 meters lies on the fringes of a rawda in Umm Al Kilab. Trees, wells and remnants of old structures can be found in situ. Aforementioned structures are aligned with Mecca.

Numerous gastropod shells of Conus spp. are found in the ruined village, despite being 6 km inland, and a shell mound is found at the north-east end. The purpose of these shells are unknown. Modern research has shown that some Conus shells are toxic to humans while others possess potential for pain relief.

References

Populated places in Al Shamal